Dorothea Dreams is a 1986 novel by American author Suzy McKee Charnas.

1986 American novels